Kocaeli may refer to:

Sanjak of Kocaeli, an Ottoman province
Kocaeli Province, Turkey
Kocaeli, an alternative name for İzmit
Kocaeli Peninsula, the peninsula at the north west point of Anatolia
Kocaeli, İvrindi, a  village